Fairweather is an American rock band from Virginia, United States. They have released three full-length albums on Equal Vision Records: If They Move...Kill Them (2001), Lusitania (2003) and Fairweather (2014).  The band also released several demos and the Alaska EP. In March 2011, after an 8-year hiatus, Fairweather formally announced a reunion show.  The reunion show took place May 14, 2011 at the Black Cat in Washington, DC. The band continued with further shows since the reunion and subsequently recorded and released their third album in April 2014.

Biography
Fairweather began playing shows in the Washington, D.C., and various suburbs of Fairfax, Virginia.  After much critical acclaim of their first album, If They Move...Kill Them (named from The Wild Bunch) the band booked dates with Thursday, Brand New, Saves The Day, The Movielife, Piebald, Onelinedrawing, Codeseven, and other nationally known touring acts.  The band announced that they would be disbanding in late 2003, not too long after their second full-length album, and finally disbanded in the winter of 2003. They played their final pre-hiatus show at St. Andrews Church in College Park, Maryland, with Darkest Hour, Age of Ruin, StarsHideFire, and Good Clean Fun.  The setlist was:

Blood on the Pages
Whatever it Takes
Soundtrack to the Ride
Lusitania
Letter of Intent
Let's Hear it for Dartanian
Still Paradise
Concrete Atlas
The Treachery of Images
South Street 1am
Casting Curses
The Culling Song
If They Move...Kill Them

Their reunion show lasted just over one hour and featured 13 songs plus a two song encore.  The set featured songs from all of their three albums and set was as follows:

If They Move... Kill Them
Soundtrack To The Ride
Lusitania
Letter of Intent
Blood On The Pages
Young Brash Hopeful
The Treachery of Images
I Dread the Time When Your Mouth Begins To Call Me Hunter
Concrete Atlas
Still Paradise
Burning Bridges Keep Warm
Casting Curses
Whatever It Takes
Mercer Island (encore)
Let's Hear It For Dartanian (encore)

Albums and EPs

Members
On Lusitania and Alaska 
 Jay Littleton - vocals
 Ben Green - guitar
 Peter Tsouras - guitar
 Shane Johnson - drums, bass (studio)
 Ben Murphy - bass (live)

On If They Move...Kill Them
 Jay Littleton - vocals
 Ben Green - guitar
 Scott Joplin - guitar
 Pat Broderick - drums
 Justin Cochran - bass
 Eric Burroughs - bass (live)

References

External links
Official Site
[ AllMusicGuide]
EVR
myspace

Rock music groups from Virginia
Musical groups established in 1999
Musical groups disestablished in 2003
Musical groups from Virginia
American post-hardcore musical groups
Alternative rock groups from Virginia
Equal Vision Records artists
1999 establishments in Virginia